Stalag VI-K Senne (also known as Stalag 326) was a former German World War II prisoner-of-war camp. It was named after the natural region [[Senne (Germany)|Senne ], mainly a heath landscape, were the camp was located, near to the town of Schloß Holte-Stukenbrock, in today North Rhine-Westphalia, Germany.

During the war the camp held mostly Soviet prisoners of war, but also some French, Polish and Italians.

The camp was overrun by the rapidly-advancing 2nd Armored Division on 2 April 1945, with troops of the U.S. 117th Infantry Regiment, 30th Division, subsequently taking control.

Close to the camp there are 36 mass graves of Soviet POW, and in addition around 400 graves of other men who died in the camp. In the mid-1960s a monument was erected to commemorate the approximately 65,000 men interred there.

Early the following year the camp became  - a camp through which 150,000 refugees and displaced persons passed before it was closed in 1969.

A police training institute has occupied the camp administration blocks since 1970, and there is a permanent exhibition of articles, photographs and documents pertaining to the camp in the "Documentation Centre" there.

See also
 List of prisoner-of-war camps in Germany

References 

World War II prisoner of war camps in Germany
Buildings and structures in North Rhine-Westphalia